Teddy, the Rough Rider is a 1940 American short drama film directed by Ray Enright. It won an Oscar at the 13th Academy Awards for Best Short Subject (Two-Reel).

Cast
 Sidney Blackmer as Theodore Roosevelt
 Pierre Watkin as Senator Platt
 Arthur Loft as Big Jim Rafferty
 Theodore von Eltz as William Loeb Jr.
 Clay Clement as Avery D. Andrews
 Douglas Wood as President William McKinley
 Robert Warwick as Captain Leonard Wood
 Selmer Jackson as John W. Riggs, Cabinet Member
 Edward McWade as Russell Alger, Secretary of War
 Edward Van Sloan as Elihu Root, Secretary of State (uncredited)
 Frank Mayo as Cabinet Member (uncredited) 
 Jack Mower as Secretary (uncredited)

References

External links

1940 films
1940 drama films
1940 short films
American drama short films
Cultural depictions of Theodore Roosevelt
1940s English-language films
Films directed by Ray Enright
Live Action Short Film Academy Award winners
Warner Bros. short films
1940s American films